Brje pri Komnu is a village in the Municipality of Komen in the Littoral region of Slovenia next to the border with Italy.

References

External links
Brje pri Komnu on Geopedia

Populated places in the Municipality of Komen